King Cobra is a 2016 American biographical film about the life and early career of former gay pornographic film actor Sean Paul Lockhart. It was directed by Justin Kelly and based on the book Cobra Killer: Gay Porn, Murder, and the Manhunt to Bring the Killers to Justice by Andrew E. Stoner and Peter A. Conway.

The film was released on October 21, 2016, by IFC Midnight.

Plot 
Seventeen-year-old Sean Paul Lockhart arrives in Pennsylvania to film a solo sex scene under the direction of Stephen Kocis, the owner of Cobra Videos. Lockhart lies to his mother, claiming that he is visiting Pennsylvania to intern with a film company, and also lies to Kocis about his age, saying he is eighteen. Lockhart chooses Brent Corrigan as his stage name, and after a successful first video agrees to stay on and continue filming gay pornography with partners, all under the direction of Kocis. Kocis, who is also housing Corrigan, becomes gradually infatuated with Corrigan, and they have sex despite Corrigan's reluctance.

Faded escort Joe Kerekes and his muse Harlow Cuadra run a competitor porn site called Viper Boyz. Kerekes is aggressively possessive of Cuadra, and the couple are slipping into debt due to their extravagant lifestyle. Cuadra becomes increasingly irate at the popularity of Corrigan.

Corrigan's videos become extremely popular, and upon learning how unfairly he is paid, Corrigan starts to feel animosity towards Kocis. He asks for a high fee for his next video, and although Kocis agrees to raise sightly, he reminds Corrigan that he is under contract. Later that evening, he discovers that Kocis has earned exorbitant amounts, and after a fight Corrigan leaves to return home. After losing out on a high-profile contract due to Kocis legally owning his name, and after a telephone confrontation where Kocis tries to assert his position, Corrigan reports to the police that he was seventeen in the videos he filmed with Kocis. Kocis is indicted with child pornography charges and Corrigan's actions cause repercussions throughout the gay porn industry while rendering him unable to obtain work. It also causes friction with his mother, who looks upon him unfavorably.

Kerekes and Cuadra offer Corrigan $25,000 to perform in a video with Viper Boyz, however grow agitated that Kocis retains ownership of the Brent Corrigan moniker. Cuadra gains entry to Kocis' house by pretending to audition for Cobra Video, and during the audition he violently stabs Kocis to death. He and Kerekes rob the house before burning it down in an attempt to make it look as though Kocis died from arson.

Quickly uncovered as foul play, Kocis' death launches a murder investigation. Corrigan goes to the police to disclose he believes Kerekes and Cuadra were responsible. He visits their residence with a wire, and captures Cuadra's confession to the killing. In the moments before their arrest, they consider the gravity of their crimes before reaffirming their love. At the police station, Corrigan reconciles with his mother. In the final shots, Corrigan is shown to be director and actor on set, producing porn with his own studio.

Cast 
 Garrett Clayton as Sean Paul Lockhart
 Christian Slater as Stephen Kocis
 Keegan Allen as Harlow Cuadra
 James Franco as Joseph "Joe" Kerekes
 Alicia Silverstone as Janette Lockhart 
 Spencer Lofranco as Mikey
 Molly Ringwald as Amy Kocis
 Sean Grandillo as Caleb

Release 
King Cobra premiered at the 2016 Tribeca Film Festival in April 2016. Shortly after, IFC Films acquired distribution rights to the film. The film was released in the US on October 21, 2016.

Reception 
Rotten Tomatoes reports that 43% of 35 surveyed critics gave the film a positive review; the average rating is 5.3/10. Metacritic rated it 48/100 based on 19 reviews. Graham Fuller of Screen Daily wrote that it was "a movie of such wit and daring that it could transcend its LGBT appeal to become a crossover hit". David Ehrlich of IndieWire gave it a letter grade of B+ and described it as a "rock-solid dark comedy" with an excellent cast. Peter Debruge of Variety called it "all smut and no soul", comparing it to Cinemax After Dark. John DeFore of The Hollywood Reporter called it "a dreary would-be thriller" that has poor pacing.

Corrigan himself was approached about playing a supporting role in the film but declined. He later criticized the filmmakers for "bastardising" his life to present an inaccurate portrayal of the murder and of his time in pornography.

References

External links 
 

2016 films
2016 biographical drama films
2016 crime drama films
2016 LGBT-related films
2010s English-language films
American biographical drama films
American crime drama films
American LGBT-related films
Biographical films about LGBT people
Crime films based on actual events
Films about gay male pornography
Films based on non-fiction books
Films set in Pennsylvania
Films shot in New York (state)
Gay-related films
LGBT-related drama films
2010s American films